Events from the year 1994 in art.

Events
February 12 – Edvard Munch's painting The Scream is stolen, in Oslo (recovered on May 7).
April 8 – Restoration of the Sistine Chapel frescoes: Michelangelo's The Last Judgment in the Sistine Chapel (Vatican City) is reopened to the public after 10 years of restoration.
November 26 – The Ministry of Culture and Art in Poland orders exhumation of the presumed grave of absurdist painter, playwright and novelist Stanisław Ignacy Witkiewicz (suicide 1939) in Zakopane. Genetic tests on the remaining bones prove that the body belongs to an unknown woman.

Awards
Archibald Prize: Francis Giacco – Homage to John Reichard
Turner Prize: Antony Gormley

Works

Jake and Dinos Chapman – Great Deeds Against the Dead (sculpture)
Martin Creed – Work No 88: A sheet of A4 paper crumpled into a ball
Neil Estern – Statue of Fiorello H. La Guardia (sculpture, New York City)
Helen Frankenthaler – All About Blue
Frederick Hart – Statue of Jimmy Carter (sculpture, Atlanta)
Damien Hirst – Away from the Flock
K Foundation – K Foundation Burn a Million Quid (performance art, Jura, Scotland)
Lee Kelly – Angkor I (sculpture, Lake Oswego, Oregon)
Sarah Lucas – Au Naturel (assemblage)
Don Merkt – Driver's Seat (sculpture, Portland, Oregon)
Odd Nerdrum – Woman Kills Injured Man
Luis Royo – The Seeds of Nothing
Rob Turner – Sutton Heritage Mosaic
Bill Woodrow – In Awe of the Pawnbroker

Births
July 9 – Akiane Kramarik, American art and poetry prodigy.

Deaths

January to June
February 5 – Ben Enwonwu, Nigerian painter and sculptor (b. 1917).
February 6 – Jack Kirby, American comic book artist, writer and editor (b. 1917).
February 11 – Max Leognany, French artist (b. 1913).
February 12 – Donald Judd, American sculptor (b. 1928).
March 22 – Walter Lantz, American cartoonist and animator (b. 1899).
April 1 – Robert Doisneau, French photographer (b. 1912).
April 14 – Jean Joyet, French artist (b. 1919).
April 27 – Basil Goulandris, Greek shipowner and art collector (b. 1913).
May 7 – Clement Greenberg, American art critic (b. 1909).
May 9 – Anni Albers, German American textile artist and printmaker (b. 1899)
May 12 – Sir Alfred Beit, 2nd Baronet, British politician, art collector and philanthropist and honorary Irish citizen (b. 1903).
June 15 – Janko Brašić, Serbian painter (b. 1906).

July to September
July 3 – Felix Kelly, New Zealand-born British artist (b. 1914).
July 20 – Paul Delvaux, Belgian painter (b. 1897).
August 16 – Henry Geldzahler, American museum curator, (b. 1935)
September – Bruce Ariss, American artist (b. 1911).
September 23 – Rocco Borella, Italian painter (b. 1920).
November 4 – Sam Francis, American painter and printmaker (b. 1923).
November 8 – Marianne Straub, British textile designer (b. 1909).
November 20 – Umaña, Colombian artist (b. 1908).
December 31 – Leigh Bowery, Australian performance artist, club promoter, actor, model and fashion designer (b. 1961).

Undated
 Li Yuan-chia, Chinese-born artist, poet and curator (b. 1929)

References

 
Years of the 20th century in art
1990s in art